Soraya de Visch Eijbergen (born 6 January 1993) is a Dutch badminton player. She won the Dutch National Badminton Championships in 2015, 2016, 2019 and 2020. She won a bronze medal at the 2011 European Junior Badminton Championships in the mixed doubles event. On 25 September 2018, she announced her departure from the Dutch national team and emigration to Switzerland in pursuit of further badminton ambitions. Currently she plays inter-club competition in France for Badminton Club Chambly Oise. She competed at the 2019 Minsk European Games.

Achievements

European Junior Championships 
Mixed doubles

BWF International Challenge/Series 
Women's singles

Women's doubles

  BWF International Challenge tournament
  BWF International Series tournament
  BWF Future Series tournament

References

External links 

 

1993 births
Living people
People from Papendrecht
Dutch female badminton players
Badminton players at the 2019 European Games
European Games competitors for the Netherlands
Sportspeople from South Holland
21st-century Dutch women